The Visa-Bikar 2008 was the forty-ninth season of the Icelandic national football cup. It started on May 24, 2008 and concluded with the Final held on October 4, 2008. The winners qualified for the second qualifying round of the UEFA Europa League 2009–10.

First round
The First Round consisted of 32 teams from lower Icelandic divisions. The matches were played between May 24 and 27, 2008.

|}

Second round
The Second Round included 16 winners from the previous round as well as 24 teams from second and third division. The matches were played between June 1 and 3, 2008.

|}

Round of 32
At this point in the competition entered 12 clubs from Úrvalsdeild (first level). The matches were played on June 18 and 19, 2008.

|}

Round of 16
The matches were played on July 2 and 3, 2008.

|}

Quarterfinals
The matches were played on July 24, 2008.

|}

Semifinals

Final

External links
 Official site 

Visa-bikar
Cup
2008